Sericostola rhodanopa is a species of sedge moth in the genus Sericostola. It was described by Edward Meyrick in 1927. It is found in Colombia.

References

Moths described in 1927
Glyphipterigidae